TOMC or Tomc may refer to:

 Train of Many Colors, an excursion train in New York
 Gregor Tomc (born 1952), Slovenian sociologist, musician and activist
 Romana Tomc (born 1965), Slovenian politician